Stripped is an acoustic album by American rock band We the Kings, and features acoustic versions of eight songs off their previous album, Somewhere Somehow, it was released through Ozone Entertainment on November 24, 2014 on iTunes. It also includes two brand new songs, "Stone Walls" and "Is This the End?".

Track listing

Bonus track

Personnel
We the Kings
Travis Clark – Lead vocals, rhythm guitar, keyboard
Hunter Thomsen – Lead guitar, backing vocals
Coley O'Toole - Keyboard, rhythm guitar, backing vocals
Charles Trippy  - Bass guitar
Danny Duncan – Drums, percussion

Additional vocals on Stone Walls by crowd during performance at Northwest Missouri State University.

References

External links

Stripped at YouTube (streamed copy where licensed)

We the Kings albums
2014 albums